Elophila nigralbalis is a moth in the family Crambidae. It was described by Aristide Caradja in 1925. It is found in Japan (Honshu, Shikoku, Kyushu, the Ryukyus), Vietnam, Indonesia and Taiwan.

The length of the forewings is 4.8-5.7 mm for males and 6.3-7.3 mm for females. The ground colour of the wings is fuscous.

The larvae feed on Azolla species and Marsilea quadrifolia. Young larvae cut the leaves of their host plant and form a case. They feed on the leaf surface. Full-grown larvae reach a length of 11–15 mm.

References

Acentropinae
Moths described in 1925
Moths of Asia
Aquatic insects